George Frederick Hunt (August 24, 1831December 10, 1888) was an American physician and politician.  He served two years in the Wisconsin State Senate, representing Ozaukee and Washington counties.

Biography
George F. Hunt was born in the town of Nichols, in Tioga County, New York, in August 1831.  He attended the Oswego Academy then went on to study at the College of Physicians and Surgeons in New York, where he earned his degree as Doctor of Medicine in 1856.  Shortly after graduation, he went west to Wisconsin and started a medical practice at Cambria, Wisconsin, in Columbia County.  He remained there for three years before moving to Washington County, Wisconsin, residing first at Barton, then finally settling at West Bend in October 1861.  West Bend remained his residence for the rest of his life.

While living at West Bend, he became involved in local affairs, first as president of the Rock River Medical Society, then as district pension surgeon for the Bureau of Pensions in 1864 and 1865.  He was appointed postmaster at West Bend in 1869, under the presidency of Ulysses S. Grant, and remained in office until 1877.  He was elected president of the village in 1879 and 1880, and was then elected to the Wisconsin State Senate in the Fall of 1880.  He served in the 1881 and 1882 sessions, and was not a candidate for re-election in 1882.  Through most of his political career, Hunt was a member of the Republican Party, but he became a Democrat in the late 1870s and served in the State Senate as a member of the Democratic caucus.

Hunt suffered a stroke in 1885 and lived in an enfeebled state for the rest of his life.  He died from complications from his paralysis in December 1888, at his home in West Bend.

Personal life and family
George F. Hunt was one of at least six children born to Harvey and Mary ( Brown) Hunt.

George F. Hunt married Annie E. Salisbury on October 30, 1865, at Newberg, Wisconsin.  Annie was born in the Wisconsin Territory, a daughter of Barton Salisbury, an early settler at Mequon, Wisconsin.  George and Annie had one son, Frederick Salisbury Hunt, who became a lawyer in West Bend.

Electoral history

Wisconsin Senate (1880)

| colspan="6" style="text-align:center;background-color: #e9e9e9;"| General Election, November 2, 1880

References

External links
 

1831 births
1888 deaths
People from Nichols, New York
People from West Bend, Wisconsin
People of Wisconsin in the American Civil War
Columbia University Vagelos College of Physicians and Surgeons alumni
Physicians from Wisconsin
Wisconsin Democrats
Wisconsin Republicans
Mayors of places in Wisconsin
Wisconsin state senators
Wisconsin postmasters
19th-century American politicians